Lily Chepkorir Koros Tare is a Kenyan medical administrator, who serves as Administration Secretary in the Kenya Ministry of Health, effective December 2018.

Early life 
Lily Koros Tare was born in the Sigowet Division of Kericho County, circa 1973.

Education 
Ms. Koros went to Kipsigis Girls High School in Kericho County for her secondary education and later proceeded to pursuing a bachelor of commerce degree (administration). She also holds a master's of business administration degree in health care management, an executive master's degree in business administration (finance) and a postgraduate diploma in international leadership (hospital management). She is currently pursuing her PhD in Business Administration at Moi University.

Career 
She started her career in business administration at AIC Litein Hospital as a hospital administrator. Koros joined Moi Teaching and Referral Hospital where she served as an assistant director of Finance and Administration before joining the Commission for Implementation of the Constitution where she worked as the Director Management Services and the Ag. Secretary/Chief Executive Officer.Previously, from 21 February 2014, she served as the chief executive officer of Kenyatta National Hospital, the largest public hospital in East and Central Africa.

In March 2018, following a series of surgical mishaps at Kenyatta National Hospital, the hospital board suspended Koros and the director of medical services, Dr Bernard Githae, to "allow an audit of KeNH systems".

See also
Healthcare in Kenya

References

External links
KNH cautions against speculation on patient murder
Twelve fired for deserting workstations at KNH

Living people
Kenyan accountants
Women accountants
Kenyan healthcare managers
People from Rift Valley Province
Kericho County
Kipsigis people
People from Kericho County
1973 births